Joseph Oqua Ansa was a Senator of the Federal Republic of Nigeria. He was elected two terms in 1979 and 1983 to represent Cross River south senatorial district during the Nigerian second republic (1979-1983). He was a member of the National Party of Nigeria (NPN)

Career 
Senator Ansa was the chairman of Senate Committee on Labour and Productivity, he moved the motion which led to May Day being declared a public holiday and observed as workers day in Nigeria. It is also on record that he moved the "Senator for life" motion.

Personal life and death 
Joseph Oqua Ansa was married, he was a devoted Christian a labour unionist, writer and a politician, he died on  26 November 2019 after a brief illness, he is a father of 10 children, 14 grandchildren.

On 11 March 2020, the Nigerian Senate observed minute's silence in his memory.

References 

1940 births
2019 deaths
Nigerian politicians
Members of the Senate (Nigeria)
National Party of Nigeria politicians
Alumni of the London School of Journalism
University of Ibadan alumni
People from Cross River State